Würzel (Michael Richard Burston) is an English musician.

Wurzel, the German word for root, may also refer to:

 The Wurzels, an English band
 Mangelwurzel, a root vegetable primarily used as cattle-fodder
 Gabriele Wurzel, German politician
 Worzel Gummidge, a book and TV adaptation
 Fred Basset, a British comic strip known in Germany as "Wurzel"

See also 
 Wurtzel, disambiguation
 Worzel (disambiguation)
 Root (disambiguation)

German-language surnames